David Cecil Williams is a Canadian physician and public servant who served as Chief Medical Officer of Health for the province of Ontario from 2015 to 2021. He served as acting Chief Medical Officer of Health for the province from 2007 to 2009 and again from 2015 to 2016 until taking the position permanently. He previously held the role of Medical Officer of Health for the Thunder Bay District health unit.

His tenure for the Province of Ontario was most notable during the COVID-19 pandemic in Ontario.

Education and early career 
Williams holds three degrees from University of Toronto, a Bachelor of Science (BSc), Doctor of Medicine (MD) and Master of Health Science (MHSc). He is a fellow of Royal College of Physicians of Canada in community medicine/public health and preventive medicine.

Williams initially worked as a general practitioner and anesthetist in Sioux Lookout, Ontario and served on an international mission in a hospital setting to Tansen, Nepal.

Public health career 
Williams served as the medical officer of health for Thunder Bay, Ontario from 1991 until 2005, and again in 2011 until 2015. 

He served as associate chief medical officer of health for the province of Ontario from 2005 until 2011, and served as acting chief medical officer of health from 2007 to 2009 and again in 2015 until he took the job permanently.

Opioid epidemic 
Williams has been involved in the ongoing opioid epidemic, which affects Canada and the province of Ontario. His promoted and suggested methods to health care providers in the province involve harm reduction and the extended use of opioid replacement therapy with drugs such as suboxone. Williams expressed concerns over an increase in carfentanil presence in street drugs.

COVID-19 

As Ontario's chief medical officer of health during the COVID-19 pandemic, Williams has been leading the province's response to the COVID-19 pandemic since the first case in the COVID-19 pandemic in Canada was identified in Toronto. Williams has faced harsh criticism during the pandemic. In November 2020, Williams was scheduled to retire from his position, but was convinced to stay on by Premier Doug Ford until June 25, 2021 when he was succeeded by Kieran Moore.

References 

Canadian health officials
Physicians from Ontario
Ontario civil servants
University of Toronto alumni
Living people
People from Thunder Bay
People from Toronto
Year of birth missing (living people)